The Old Santa Rosa Catholic Church and Cemetery is a historic church building and cemetery on Main Street in Cambria, San Luis Obispo County, California. Built from 1870 to 1871, the church was the first in Cambria and is one of the oldest remaining buildings in the town. The church has a simple Classical Revival design with clapboard siding, a gable roof, a boxed cornice and frieze, and an arched entrance topped with a fanlight. The church's cemetery is behind the church building.

The church was added to the National Register of Historic Places on October 29, 1982.

References

External links

 
 
 
 Old Santa Rosa Chapel, photo gallery at Flickr

Churches in San Luis Obispo County, California
Cambria, California
Roman Catholic churches in California
Roman Catholic cemeteries in California
Roman Catholic churches completed in 1871
National Register of Historic Places in San Luis Obispo County, California
Churches on the National Register of Historic Places in California
Neoclassical architecture in California
19th-century Roman Catholic church buildings in the United States
Cemeteries in San Luis Obispo County, California
Neoclassical church buildings in the United States